This is a list of the main career statistics of former professional tennis player Helena Suková.

Major finals

Grand Slam finals

Singles: 4 (4 runners-up)

Doubles: 14 (9 titles, 5 runners-up)

Mixed doubles: 8 (5 titles, 3 runners-up)

Olympics

Women's doubles: 2 medals (2 silver medals)

Year-end championships finals

Singles: 1 (1 runner–up)

Doubles: 5 (1 title, 4 runners-up)

WTA Tour finals

Singles: 31 (10–21)

Doubles 128 (69–59)

Grand Slam performance timeline

Singles

Doubles

Mixed doubles

Suková, Helena